Events in the year 1914 in China.

Incumbents
President: Yuan Shikai
Vice President: Feng Guozhang
Premier: Xiong Xiling (until 12 February), Sun Baoqi (from 12 February  to 1 May), Xu Shichang (from 1 May)

Events
 Bai Lang Rebellion
 6 April - Establishment of the Vicariate Apostolic of Kiaotsu, in Guangdong
 Siege of Tsingtao
 Simla Accord
 Establishment of the Zhongshan Park, in Shanghai
 Establishment of the Sin Hua Bank, in Beijing

Births
4 January - Chen Tingru, World War II army officer (d. 2017)

References

1910s in China
Years of the 20th century in China